Vaju Kotak (30 January 1915 – 29 November 1959) was a Gujarati writer, publisher, journalist, and an Indian film director and screenwriter. He primarily worked in Gujarati film industry and in Bollywood during his career span. He is known to be the co-founder of weekly news magazine Chitralekha, published in Gujarati and Marathi.

Early life
Vaju Kotak was born on 30 January 1915 in Rajkot, Gujarat. He studied up to the first year of BA. In 1937, he came to Ahmedabad for a job and from 1939, settled in Bombay.

Kotak married Madhuribahen in 1946. He died on 29 November 1959 in Hurkisondas Hospital, Bombay following a heart attack.

Career

Movies
He started his film career as an assistant director and screenwriter for Kasauti (1941). In 1944, he wrote the screenplay for Paristan, directed by Mahesh Kaul. In the film he worked as an assistant director. he had also worked as a screenwriter. He wrote screenplay and dialogues for Parivartan, Bhalai, Mangalfera, Nanandbhojai, Gorakhdhandha, Lagnmandap etc.

Writing
In 1941, Kotak published his first book Ruparani, a translation of the autobiography of Isadora Duncan. He started writing a column in Jay Saurasthra magazine published from Rajkot. In 1946, he became the editor of Chitrapat. His Novel Juvan Haiya (Young Hearts) was partially published in serialized form in Chitrapat and later chapters were published in Chhaya magazine. In 1950, he started his independent weekly news magazine Chitralekha. He started monthly magazines Bij (1951) and Light (1953) in Gujarati and English respectively. In 1958, he started Jee Cinema magazine.

Ramkada Vahu, Juvan Haiya, Gharni Shobha, Chundadi ane Chokha, Ha ke Na, Aansuna Toran, Manavatano Maheraman, Aansuni Aatashbaji ane Doctor Roshanlal, Prabhatna Pushpo, Buddhina Brahmchari, Kadavna Thapa, Galgota, Puran ane Vighnan, Chandarvo, Dhondu ane Pandu, Shaherma Farata Farata and Badapanna Vanarveda are his literary works.

Kotak wrote 9 novels. His incomplete novel Dr. Roshanlal was completed by Harkisan Mehta, then editor of Chitralekha. On Silver Jubilee of Chitralekha, his novel Dr. Roshanlal was adapted into a Gujarati play, Him Angara. The play was well received and had more than 100 performances. Shaherma farta farta and Prabhatna Pushpo are his collections of essays.

Filmography 
 Hindi

 Gujarati
 Parivartan
 Bhalai
 Mangalfera
 Nanandbhojai
 Gorakhdhandha
 Lagnmandap

Recognition 
In 1973, a road in Bombay was named Vaju Kotak Marg. On 9 June 1993, spiritual leader Morari Bapu inaugurated Vaju Kotak Marg in Rajkot. On 7 September 2002, Takhteshwar Temple road in Bhavnagar was named as Vaju Kotak Marg. On 20 April 2011, the Indian Postal Department issued a postage stamp on the Chitralekha magazine depicting the image of Vaju Kotak.

See also 
 List of Gujarati-language writers

References

External links
 
 

1915 births
1959 deaths
Gujarati-language writers
People from Rajkot district
20th-century Indian male writers
Journalists from Gujarat
Screenwriters from Gujarat
Indian magazine founders
Film directors from Gujarat